New Scene (Slovak: Nová scéna, abr. ND) is a theatre located in Bratislava, the capital of Slovakia. It specializes in mainstream and Musical theatre such as musicals, comedies and fairy tales. The theatre was established in 1945 as part of a program to establish a network of theaters in the post-war years in the Slovak part of Czechoslovakia as the second theatre in the Slovakia.

The first premiere in the theatre was Shakespeare's The Taming of the Shrew on 30th of November 1946, directed by Drahoš Želenský.

Building 
The New Scene theatre is housed inside the Živnostenský dom (Živnodom) building on Živnostenská Street No. 1, in central part of Bratislava where it re-used the space formerly occupied by the Alfa cinema.

See also 
 Slovak National Theatre
 Slovak culture
 Park One

External links 
 Official site 

Theatres in Bratislava
Culture in Bratislava
Buildings and structures in Bratislava